Conterra is an unincorporated community in Cherry County, Nebraska, United States. It is located at latitude 42.448 and longitude -100.63.

History
A post office was established at Conterra in 1913, and remained in operation until it was discontinued in 1934.

References

Unincorporated communities in Cherry County, Nebraska
Unincorporated communities in Nebraska